The 2005 Ondrej Nepela Memorial was the 13th edition of an annual senior-level international figure skating competition held in Bratislava, Slovakia. It took place between September 22 and 24, 2005, at the Ondrej Nepela Ice Rink. Skaters competed in three disciplines: men's singles, ladies' singles, and ice dancing. The competition is named for 1972 Olympic gold medalist Ondrej Nepela.

Results

Men

Ladies

Ice dancing

External links
 13th Ondrej Nepela Memorial

Ondrej Nepela Memorial, 2005
Ondrej Nepela Memorial
Ondrej Nepela Memorial, 2005